This is a list of the most notable films produced in Serbia and Montenegro between 1992 and 2006, including the period when the state was known as the Federal Republic of Yugoslavia (until 2003).

1992–2006

See also
 List of Montenegrin films
 List of Serbian films
 List of Yugoslav films

External links
 Yugoslav film at the Internet Movie Database

1990-2003
Films
Lists of 1990s films
Films
Lists of 2000s films